These are the results of the 2020 Asian Wrestling Championships which took place between 18 and 23 February 2020 in New Delhi, India.

Men's freestyle

57 kg
22 February

61 kg
23 February

65 kg
22 February

70 kg
22 February

74 kg
23 February

79 kg
22 February

86 kg
23 February

92 kg
23 February

97 kg
22 February

125 kg
23 February

Men's Greco-Roman

55 kg
18 February

60 kg
19 February

63 kg
18 February

67 kg
19 February

72 kg
19 February

77 kg
18 February

82 kg
19 February

87 kg
18 February

97 kg
19 February

130 kg
18 February

Women's freestyle

50 kg
20 February

53 kg
21 February

55 kg
20 February

57 kg
21 February

59 kg
20 February

62 kg
21 February

65 kg
21 February

68 kg
20 February

72 kg
21 February

76 kg
20 February

References

External links
Official website

2020 Results